Club Deportivo y Social Vida, or simply Vida, is a Honduran football club based in La Ceiba, Atlántida.

The club has won two domestic league titles and has finished second four times.

History

Salvavida
The club that is today known as Vida was founded on 14 October 1940, as a result of a split in the board of directors of Atlántida.  Gregorio Ramos, one of the Atlántida directors, decided to found his own team.  Since it was initially sponsored by the brewery Cervecería Hondureña, SA, the club took the name Salvavida, a brand of beer that the brewery produced.

Later on, the relationship between Cervezería Hondureña and Salvavida was coming to an end.  According to club legend, the wife of one of the club directors (Vida Code de Castañeda) fell into a river or a lake while the team was walking by.  The cry of "un salvavida para vida" (a lifesaver for Vida) went up.  This was supposedly the inspiration for the modern name, Vida.

1940s and 1950s
During the 1940s, most of the club's players were employees of team president Gregorio Ramos, who was also owner of Lavanderia Ramos. He also was the president of the team and contributed economically and handled the team affairs. The training was carried out in a small field located that was property of the Standard Fruit Company (DOLE).  Another source of players were students from the local public school, Instituto Manuel Bonilla and those from the amateur soccer club Deportes Diablos Negros.  The most notable stars of these years were the famous Talon Arzú, Alberto "Campion" Amaya, Héctor "Jet" Castillo McKenzie, Quiro Brooks, Cristóbal Craka Brooks, and the Spaniard Rafael "El Fafa" from Navarre.

Vida's rise to prominence
Vida's breakthrough came in the 1960s, with the energy provided by rising stars such as Salvador Hernández, Nilmo Edwards, and the brothers Morris and Junia Garden. In 1961, Vida finished runners-up in the national tournament, losing out only to Olimpia.  They won the whole thing in 1964, beating out Salamar of San Lorenzo in Tegucigalpa.

In 1964, when the previously amateur Honduran league officially turned professional, the city of La Ceiba was offered one place.  Vida prevailed in a play-off against two local rivals, Victoria and Atlántida, to earn the city's slot in the new top flight.  The previously amateur players were awarded salaries drawn from ticket sales, and the old field where Vida used to play was converted into a genuine stadium, the Estadio Ceibeño. With the stadium built, Vida moved to Campo Vida located in the neighborhood La Isla as their training ground (which is still preserved to this date, and used for youth league teams in La Ceiba).

CDS Vida: The glory years (1965–1985)
From 1965 to 1975, Vida was a frequent finisher in  the Top 4 of the Honduran Major League Soccer.  Their best season during this stretch was 1971, when they finished 2nd to Olimpia.  Their success continued throughout the 1970s, as they were a regular qualifier for the quadrangular playoff, but it was the early 1980s that saw the club's greatest run of success.

It started in 1981, when Vida finished 3rd in the first phase to qualify for the playoffs.  In the quadrangular, they finished level with Motagua at the top of the table, and prevailed 2–0.  Then, in the championship against regular season winners Atlético Morazán, Vida triumphed 4–1 on aggregate.  They won a second title in 1983, then narrowly finished as runners-up to Olimpia and Marathon in 1984 and 1985.

During the 1980s, the team's notable players were Enrique "Palanca" Mendoza, Matilde Lacayo, Dennis "La Bomba" Hinds, Cipriano Dueños (national scoring Champion in 1986) and Roberto "Macho" Figueroa (a key player in the Honduras National team that earned the berth to the World Cup Spain 1982, sold to Real Murcia after the tournament).

Decline and descent into obscurity
Vida's decline began in 1986.  The club had finished 1st in the regular season and third in the quadrangular play-offs; by most accounts a respectable year.  However, shortly after the end of the playoffs, the club was rocked by a match-fixing scandal.  Specifically, the accusation was that they deliberately threw the title to Olimpia.

Vida never recovered, and it took many years before they even appeared a top-flight challenger.  Even after the Apertura and the Clausura were adopted, Vida has struggled. They have not reached a final since their glory days.

Club rivalries

Clásico Ceibeño
El Clásico Ceibeño (La Ceiba derby) is a football match played between Victoria and CDS Vida, both teams from La Ceiba, Honduras.

Achievements
Domestic
Liga Nacional de Fútbol de Honduras: 2
1981–82, 1983–84
Runner-up (3): 1971–72, 1984–85, 1985–86

Liga Amateur de Honduras: 1
1961–62

League and play-off performance (1994–present)

All-time table
(From 1965/66 to 2007/08)

Performance (1997–98 – present)
{| style="width:100%;"
|-
| style="width:75%;" |

International competition

CONCACAF Champions' Cup
1963 CONCACAF Champions' Cup
First Round v.  Xelajú MC – 2:2, 0:6 (Xelajú advanced 8:2 on aggregate)

1972 CONCACAF Champions' Cup
Final Round v.  Toluca – 1:3, 0:1 (Toluca advanced 4:1 on aggregate)

1973 CONCACAF Champions' Cup
First Round v.  Saprissa – 0:2, 0:1 (Saprissa advanced 3:0 on aggregate)

1982 CONCACAF Champions' Cup
First Round v.  Brooklyn Dodgers – (Brooklyn Dodgers withdrew)
Second Round v.  Pumas UNAM – 2:2, 0:5 (Pumas UNAM advance 7:2 on aggregate)

1984 CONCACAF Champions' Cup
Third Round v.  NY Pancyprian-Freedoms – 1:1, 1:2 (NY Pancyprian-Freedoms advance 3:2 on aggregate)

1985 CONCACAF Champions' Cup
First Round v.  FAS – 1:1, 2:1 (Vida advance 3:2 on aggregate)
Second Round v.  América – 1:0, 0:3 (América advance 3:1 on aggregate)

Torneo Fraternidad
1981 Torneo Fraternidad
First Round v.  Juventud Retalteca – 0:1, 3:1 (Vida advance 3:2 on aggregate)
Second Round v.  Marathón – (Marathón advance)

1982 Torneo Fraternidad
First Round v.  Juventud Independiente – 2:1, 1:0 (Vida advance 3:1 on aggregate)
Second Round v.  Xelajú MC – 0:0, 0:2 (Xelajú MC advance 2:0 on aggregate)

All-time top scorers
(As of 8 February 2012)
 Carlos Alvarado (76 goals)
 Dennis Hinds (44 goals)
 Arturo Garden (40 goals)
 Matilde Selim Lacayo (39 goals)
 Morris Garden (37 goals)
 Jorge Pineda (37 goals)
 Enrique Mendoza (36 goals)

Current squad

Current technical staff

Managers

 Aroldo Cordón
 Carlos Enrique "Ronco" Wellman (1971)
 Roberto González (1981)
 Gonzalo Zelaya (1983)
 Roberto González (1984–85)
 Mario Ramón Sandoval (1995)
 Ariel Sena (1995–1996)
 Enrique Grey Fúnez (1996)
 Héctor Vargas (1999–00)
 David Medina (2001)
 Ricardo Ortiz (2006)
 Carlos Martínez (2007 – Dec 12)
 Jorge Pineda (Dec 2012 – April 14)
 Ramón Maradiaga (May 2014 – Sept 15)
 Elvin López (201?–)
 Carlos Alberto Pavon Plumer (2016 – December 2019)
 Raúl Martínez Sambula ( - February 2019)
 Hector Castellon (February 2019 -)
 Fernando Araújo (June 2019 - )
 Ramón Maradiaga (August 2020 - November 2020)
 Nerlin Membreño (November 2020 - April 2021)
 Fernando Mira (April 2021 - )

Old logos

Affiliated clubs
  Atlético Madrid

References

External links
Official website

C.D.S. Vida
Vida
Vida
Association football clubs established in 1940
1940 establishments in Honduras